Christopher Ronald Petersen (born November 6, 1970) is a former middle infielder in Major League Baseball who played 7 games for the Colorado Rockies in 1999.

Amateur career
Petersen attended Southington High School in Southington, Connecticut and then Georgia Southern University, where he appeared in the 1990 College World Series. In 1991, he played collegiate summer baseball in the Cape Cod Baseball League for the Yarmouth-Dennis Red Sox and was named a league all-star.

Professional career
Selected in the 9th round of the 1992 draft (247th overall) by the Chicago Cubs, Petersen spent several years in the minors before making his major league debut on May 25 with the Colorado Rockies in 1999.  He played shortstop in his first start in the Major Leagues against the Houston Astros where he went 1 for 4. In the rest of his season he collected one more hit and two RBIs in nine additional at bats. He finished his season with a .154 batting average, 2 RBI and one run in 13 career at bats. He had a .966 career fielding percentage.

After playing with the Colorado Rockies, Petersen played seasons in AAA with the Atlanta Braves, Pittsburgh Pirates, and the Arizona Diamondbacks.

Petersen spent 2003 and 2004 with the independent Nashua Pride of the Atlantic League.

References

External links

1970 births
Living people
Major League Baseball second basemen
Colorado Rockies players
Georgia Southern Eagles baseball players
Baseball players from Boston
Nashville Sounds players
Richmond Braves players
Nashua Pride players
Geneva Cubs players
Daytona Cubs players
Orlando Cubs players
Iowa Cubs players
Colorado Springs Sky Sox players
Altoona Curve players
Tucson Sidewinders players
Yarmouth–Dennis Red Sox players
People from Southington, Connecticut
Baseball coaches from Connecticut